Polyhymno tropaea is a moth of the family Gelechiidae. It was described by Edward Meyrick in 1908. It is found in Namibia and the South African provinces of Limpopo, Gauteng and North-West.

The wingspan is about 8 mm. The forewings are bronzy fuscous irrorated (sprinkled) with dark fuscous and with white markings. There is a median longitudinal streak from the base to the middle, then bent to meet at a very acute angle a narrow very oblique streak from the middle of the costa, the bent portion closely followed by a similar parallel streak meeting the same costal streak produced. There are two shorter less oblique costal streaks posteriorly, the second mostly in the cilia and edged with blackish. There is a narrow irregular streak along the posterior part of the fold and a narrow almost marginal streak along the lower half of the termen, extended round the tornus. The hindwings are grey.

References

Moths described in 1908
Polyhymno